José Domingo Espinar is a corregimiento in San Miguelito District, Panamá Province, Panama with a population of 44,471 as of 2010. Its population as of 1990 was 58,745; its population as of 2000 was 35,301.

References

Corregimientos of Panamá Province
San Miguelito District